Jontay Porter (born November 15, 1999) is an American professional basketball player for the Wisconsin Herd of the NBA G League. He played college basketball for the Missouri Tigers. Porter was previously listed as a recruit under the Class of 2018 before reclassifying up a year to join his older brother, Michael Porter Jr., at Missouri.

High school career
Much like his older brother Michael, Jontay started out his high school career playing under the Father Tolton Regional Catholic High School in their home town of Columbia, Missouri. In his freshman year, he averaged 11.8 points and 7.8 rebounds per game for Father Tolton before being a key figure in helping them win the Missouri Class 3 State Championship for the first time during his sophomore season. In his junior year of high school, Jontay and Michael, along with their younger brother Coban, would move to Seattle, Washington after his father earned an assistant coaching job at the University of Washington for their basketball team. During Jontay and Michael's time at Nathan Hale High School, the brothers would be coached by former NBA All-Star Brandon Roy, who would help lead the squad to a perfect 29–0 record and the Washington Class 3A State Championship. Under the coaching of Roy, Porter would average a double-double of 14.3 points and 13.6 rebounds per game for Nathan Hale High School, thus earning a name for himself alongside his older brother.

Porter was previously a recruit under the Class of 2018, with him being ranked as high as 11th overall by ESPN at one point. However, after his father was hired as an assistant coach for the University of Missouri, his older brother changed his commitment from the University of Washington to his hometown University of Missouri, and Brandon Roy changed coaching positions from Nathan Hale to Garfield High School, Jontay would reclassify himself into the Class of 2017 alongside his brother, joining his family out at the University of Missouri. Between his time preparing for his transfer from high school into college, Porter would gain two more inches to his body, thus allowing him to play as a power forward, with center being a viable possibility as well.

Recruiting

College career
Porter made his season debut on November 10, 2017, in a 74–59 win over Iowa State University. Three days after his debut, he recorded 11 points and 8 rebounds in a blowout 99–55 win over Wagner College. One week later, Porter recorded his first collegiate double-double with 11 points and 11 rebounds in a 67–62 win over Emporia State University. On January 10, 2018, Porter made his first start of the season for Missouri, recording a double-double of 15 points and 10 rebounds in a 68–56 win over the University of Georgia. Porter would continue starting for the team during the next five games before returning to the bench for the rest of the season. On February 27, Porter scored a season-high 24 points to go with a team-leading 7 rebounds and 6 assists in a 74–66 win over Vanderbilt University. In his last game of the season, he started for Missouri in the NCAA Tournament. On April 5, Porter announced he would enter the 2018 NBA Draft alongside his brother. However, unlike Michael Porter Jr., he would enter the draft without hiring an agent first, thus allowing him the possibility to return to Missouri for another year if he so chooses. On the May 30 draft day deadline, Porter decided to return to Missouri instead of entering the NBA Draft early.

On October 21, 2018, it was announced that Porter would miss his sophomore season after tearing both his ACL and MCL in a scrimmage. While rehabilitating, Porter tore his ACL again on March 23, 2019. Despite the injury, Porter entered his name for the 2019 NBA Draft as one of 233 early-entrant participants. Porter was also one of 66 original participants included in the 2019 NBA Draft Combine. By May 30, Porter left his name in the 2019 NBA draft's entry pool.

Professional career

Memphis Grizzlies (2020–2021)
Porter went undrafted in the 2019 NBA draft. On March 8, 2020, Porter signed with the Memphis Grizzlies. On November 22, 2020, the Memphis Grizzlies announced that they had re-signed Porter to multi-year contract. On July 30, 2021, he was waived by the Grizzlies after making 11 appearances.

Porter joined the Denver Nuggets for the 2022 NBA Summer League.

Wisconsin Herd (2022–present)
On November 3, 2022, Porter was named to the opening night roster for the Wisconsin Herd.

Personal life
In addition to his older brother (currently with the Denver Nuggets), he has two older sisters named Bri and Cierra, both of whom were deemed medically retired from playing sports due to multiple injuries involving their legs. Cierra Porter came out of medical retirement to return for her senior year at the University of Missouri.

Career statistics

NBA

|-
| style="text-align:left;"|2020–21
| style="text-align:left;"|Memphis
| 11 || 0 || 4.9 || .533 || .375 || .600 || 1.3 || .1 || .3 || .1 || 2.0
|- class="sortbottom"
| style="text-align:center;" colspan="2"|Career
| 11 || 0 || 4.9 || .533 || .375 || .600 || 1.3 || .1 || .3 || .1 || 2.0

College

|-
| style="text-align:left;"|2017–18
| style="text-align:left;"|Missouri
| 33 || 7 || 24.5 || .437 || .364 || .750 || 6.8 || 2.2 || .8 || 1.7 || 9.9

References

External links
 Missouri Tigers bio

1999 births
Living people
African-American basketball players
American men's basketball players
Basketball players from Missouri
Basketball players from Seattle
Centers (basketball)
Memphis Grizzlies players
Memphis Hustle players
Missouri Tigers men's basketball players
Power forwards (basketball)
Sportspeople from Columbia, Missouri
Undrafted National Basketball Association players
21st-century African-American sportspeople